Senator Whitney may refer to:

Arthur Whitney (politician) (1871–1942), New Jersey State Senate
George H. Whitney (1863–1928), New York State Senate
James Scollay Whitney (1811–1878), Massachusetts State Senate
Orson F. Whitney (1855–1931), Utah State Senate